Janko Smole (2 June 1921 – 11 June 2010) served as the president of the executive council of the Socialist Republic of Slovenia from 1965 to 1967. He was a member of the League of Communists of Slovenia. He was preceded by Viktor Avbelj and succeeded by Stane Kavčič. He was Finance Minister of Yugoslavia from 1967 to 1974.

References

Governors of the National Bank of Yugoslavia
Presidents of the Executive Council of the Socialist Republic of Slovenia
Finance ministers of Yugoslavia
1921 births
2010 deaths
League of Communists of Slovenia politicians